The United States Army Signal Corps (USASC) is a branch of the United States Army that creates and manages communications and information systems for the command and control of combined arms forces. It was established in 1860, the brainchild of Major Albert J. Myer, and had an important role in the American Civil War. Over its history, it had the initial responsibility for portfolios and new technologies that were eventually transferred to other U.S. government entities. Such responsibilities included military intelligence, weather forecasting, and aviation.

Mission statement
Support for the command and control of combined arms forces. Signal support includes network operations (information assurance, information dissemination management, and network management) and management of the electromagnetic spectrum. Signal support encompasses all aspects of designing, installing, data communications networks that employ single and multi-channel satellite, tropospheric scatter, terrestrial microwave, switching, messaging, video-teleconferencing, visual information, and other related systems. They integrate tactical, strategic and sustaining base communications, information processing and management systems into a seamless global information network that supports knowledge dominance for Army, joint and coalition operations.

Early history

While serving as a medical officer in Texas in 1856, Albert James Myer proposed that the Army use his visual communications system, called aerial telegraphy (or "wig-wag"). When the Army adopted his system on 21 June 1860, the Signal Corps was born with Myer as the first and only Signal Officer.

Major Myer first used his visual signaling system on active service in New Mexico during the early 1860s Navajo expedition. Using flags for daytime signaling and a torch at night, wigwag was tested in Civil War combat in June 1861 to direct the fire of a harbor battery at Fort Wool against the Confederate positions opposite Fort Monroe. For nearly three years, Myer was forced to rely on detailed personnel, although he envisioned a separate, trained professional military signal service.

Myer's vision came true on 3 March 1863, when Congress authorized a regular Signal Corps for the duration of the war. Some 2,900 officers and enlisted men served, although not at any single time, in the Civil War Signal Corps.

Myer's Civil War innovations included an unsuccessful balloon experiment at First Bull Run, and, in response to McClellan's desire for a Signal Corps field telegraph train, an electric telegraph in the form of the Beardslee magnetoelectric telegraph machine. Even in the Civil War, the wigwag system, restricted to line-of-sight communications, was waning in the face of the electric telegraph.

Initially, Myer used his office downtown in Washington, D.C. to house the Signal Corps School. When it was found to need additional space, he sought out other locations. First came Fort Greble, one of the Defenses of Washington during the Civil War, and when that proved inadequate, Myer chose Fort Whipple, on Arlington Heights overlooking the national capital. The size and location were outstanding. The school remained there for over 20 years and ultimately was renamed Fort Myer.

Signal Corps detachments participated in campaigns fighting Native Americans in the west, such as the Powder River Expedition of 1865.

In July 1866, Congress decided that there should be a unit or at least a Cadre of Signal even in peace time.  It thereupon provided:  One Chief Signal Officer of the Army, with the rank of Colonel.  To confuse things even more, the 6 officers and 100 men authorized for the Signal Corp were to be chosen from the Corps of Engineers.  Thus the Signal Corps was officially born.

The electric telegraph, in addition to visual signaling, became a Signal Corps responsibility in 1867. Within 12 years, the Signal Corps had constructed, and was maintaining and operating, some 4,000 miles of telegraph lines along the country's western frontier.

In 1870, the Signal Corps established a congressionally mandated national weather service. Within a decade, with the assistance of Lieutenant Adolphus Greely, Myer commanded a weather service of international acclaim. 

Myer died in 1880, having attained the rank of brigadier general and the title of Chief Signal Officer.  In 1881, as a lasting memorial to General Myer, Fort Whipple was renamed Fort Myer. 

The Weather Bureau became part of the U.S. Department of Agriculture in 1891, while the corps retained responsibility for military meteorology.

In 1881, the Signal Corps participated in the First International Polar Year.  One of the groups under the command of LT Adolphus Greely was to write another grueling chapter of suffering and extinction in the history of the Arctic.  Greely's Signal Corps volunteers became separated from their base camp and were marooned on a huge ice flow.  They were decimated by starvation and drowning; of the original 25 volunteers, only 7 survived.

The Signal Corps' role in the Spanish–American War of 1898 and the subsequent Philippine Insurrection was on a grander scale than it had been in the Civil War. In addition to visual signaling, including heliograph, the corps supplied telephone and telegraph wire lines and cable communications, fostered the use of telephones in combat, employed combat photography, and renewed the use of balloons. Shortly after the war, the Signal Corps constructed the Washington-Alaska Military Cable and Telegraph System (WAMCATS), also known as the Alaska Communications System (ACS), introducing the first wireless telegraph in the Western Hemisphere.

In October 1903, Congress handed the then Chief Signal Officer Brigadier General Greely what may be considered the supreme challenge.  Accompanied by an appropriation $25,000 it decreed that the military should "build a flying machine for war purposes".  Needless to say, the first attempts at flying were failures, but BG Greely handed the contract to the Wright brothers who piloted the first aircraft at Kitty Hawk, North Carolina.

World War I
For more details on this topic, see Aeronautical Division, U.S. Signal Corps and Aviation Section, U.S. Signal Corps

On 1 August 1907, an Aeronautical Division was established within the Office of the Chief Signal Officer (OCSO). In 1908, on Fort Myer, Virginia, the Wright brothers made test flights of the Army's first airplane built to Signal Corps' specifications. Reflecting the need for an official pilot rating, War Department Bulletin No. 2, released on 24 February 1911, established a "Military Aviator" rating. Army aviation remained within the Signal Corps until 1918, when it became the Army Air Service.

During World War I. Chief Signal Officer George Owen Squier worked closely with private industry to perfect radio tubes while creating a major signal laboratory at Camp Alfred Vail (Fort Monmouth). Early radiotelephones developed by the Signal Corps were introduced into the European theater in 1918. While the new American voice radios were superior to the radiotelegraph sets, telephone and telegraph remained the major technology of World War I.

A pioneer in radar, Colonel William Blair, director of the Signal Corps laboratories at Fort Monmouth, patented the first Army radar demonstrated in May 1937. Even before the United States entered World War II, mass production of two radar sets, the SCR-268 and the SCR-270, had begun. Along with the Signal Corps' tactical FM radio, also developed in the 1930s, radar was the most important communications development of World War II.

During World War I, women switchboard operators, known as the "Hello Girls", were sworn into the U.S. Army Signal Corps. Despite the fact that they wore U.S. Army uniforms and were subject to Army regulations (Chief Operator Grace Banker received the Distinguished Service Medal), they were not given honorable discharges but were considered "civilians" employed by the military, because Army regulations specified the male gender. Not until 1978—the 60th anniversary of the end of World War I—did Congress approve veteran status/honorable discharges for the remaining "Hello Girls".

World War II

When the War Department was reorganized on 9 March 1942, the Signal Corps became one of the technical services in the Services of
Supply (later Army Service Forces). Its organized components served both the Army Ground Forces and the Army Air Forces.

The Army Chief Signal Officer (CSO) was responsible for establishing and maintaining communications service schools for officers and enlisted soldiers, ranging in qualifications from those holding doctorates to functional illiterates. The single pre-war Signal training site was Fort Monmouth, New Jersey. To keep up with the demand for more signallers, the CSO opened more training facilities: Camp Crowder, Missouri; Camp Kohler, California; and Camp Murphy, Florida.

The Eastern Signal Corps Training Center at Fort Monmouth consisted of an officers' school, an officer candidate school, an enlisted school and a basic training center at subpost Camp Wood. The officer candidate school operated from 1941 to 1946 and graduated 21,033 Signal Corps second lieutenants.

The term "RADAR" was coined by the Navy in 1940 and agreed to by the Army in 1941. The first Signal Corps Field Manual on Aircraft Warning Service defined RADAR as "a term used to designate radio sets SCR (Signal Corps Radio)-268 and SCR-270 and similar equipment". The SCR-268 and 270 were not radios at all, but were designated as such to keep their actual function secret. Although important offensive applications have since been developed, radar emerged historically from the defensive need to counter the possibility of massive aerial bombardment.

In 1941, the laboratories at Fort Monmouth developed the SCR-300, the first FM backpack radio. Its pioneering frequency modulation circuits provided front-line troops with reliable, static-free communications. The labs also fielded multichannel FM radio relay sets (e.g., AN/TRC-1) in the European Theater of Operations as early as 1943. Multichannel radio broadcasting allowed several channels of communications to be broadcast over a single radio signal, increasing security and range and relieving frequency spectrum crowding.

In December 1942, the War Department directed the Signal Corps General Development Laboratories and the Camp Evans Signal Lab to combine into the Signal Corps Ground Service (SCGS) with headquarters at Bradley Beach, New Jersey (Hotel Grossman). The Department also directed the Signal Corps Ground Service to cut total military and civilian personnel from 14,518 military and civilian personnel to 8,879 by August 1943. In June 1944, "Signees", former Italian prisoners of war, arrived at Fort Monmouth to perform housekeeping duties. A lieutenant colonel and 500 enlisted men became hospital, mess, and repair shop attendants, relieving American soldiers from these duties.

One of the more unusual units of the Signal Corps were the Joint Assault Signal Company (JASCOs). These companies were Signal Corps units that were made up of several hundred Army, Air Corps, and United States Navy communications specialists specially trained to link land, sea and air operational elements. They saw combat throughout the Pacific and European theaters during World War II in late 1943. JASCOs were much larger than normal signal companies. The joint assault signal companies were the predecessor to the Air Naval Gunfire Liaison Company that exists today. JASCOs represented but one of many unprecedented Signal Corps' activities in the Pacific theater. Shipboard fighting was a new kind of combat for Signal Corps soldiers. Army communicators sometimes plied their trade aboard Navy and civilian ships. Signal Corps personnel also served on Army communications ships.

In particular the Southwest Pacific Area (SWPA) formed a fleet, unofficially known as the "Catboat Flotilla" and formally as the CP fleet, that served as command and communication vessels during amphibious operations, starting with two Australian schooners Harold and Argosy Lemal acquired by the Army and converted during the first half of 1943 by Australian firms into communications ships with AWA radio sets built by Amalgamated Wireless of Australia installed. These initial vessels were joined by Geoanna, Volador and later by a more capable fleet as described in The Signal Corps: The Outcome (Mid-1943 Through 1945):

The first task was to obtain ships more suitable than the Harold or the Argosy. Such a ship was the freighterpassenger, FP-47, acquired by Signal Corps in March 1944, at Sydney. The Army had built her in the United States in 1942, a sturdy, wooden, diesel-driven vessel only 114 feet long, but broad, of 370 tons, intended for use in the Aleutians. Instead she had sailed to Australia as a tug. The Signal Corps fitted her with Australian transmitters and receivers, also with an SCR-300 walkietalkie, two SCR-808's, and an SCR-608, plus power equipment, antennas, and, finally, quarters for the Signal Corps operators. The Australian sets were intended for long-range CW signals operating in the high frequencies; the SCRs were short-range VHF FM radios for use in the fleet net and for ship-toshore channels. Armed with antiaircraft weapons and machine guns (served by 12 enlisted men of the Army ship and gun crews), navigated by a crew of 6 Army Transport Service officers and the 12 men already mentioned, the FP-47 was ready for service in June. Her Signal Corps complement consisted of one officer and 12 men.

The facilities of FP-47 were needed immediately at Hollandia to supplement the heavily loaded signal nets that could hardly carry the message burden imposed by the invasion and the subsequent build-up there of a great base. Arriving on 25 June, she anchored offshore and ran cables to the message centers on land. Her powerful transmitters opened new channels to SWPA headquarters in Brisbane and to the advance headquarters still at Port Moresby. At Hollandia, and at Biak, to which the FP-47 moved early in September, this one ship handled an average of 7,000 to 11,000 code groups a day.

Many film industry personalities served in the Signal Corps, including Stan Lee, an American comic book writer, Tony Randall, the actor, and Jean Shepherd, radio storyteller, author and narrator of A Christmas Story.

In 1942 General George C. Marshall ordered the creation of the Army Pictorial Service (APS) to produce motion pictures for the training, indoctrination, and entertainment of the American forces and their Allies. The APS took over Kaufman Astoria Studios in 1942 and produced over 2,500 films during the war with over 1,000 redubbed in other languages. The Army left Astoria studios and film production in 1971.

Julius Rosenberg worked for the Signal Corps Labs from 1940 to 1945. He was dismissed early in 1945 when it was learned he had been a member of the Communist Party USA secret apparatus, and had passed to the Soviet Union the secret of the proximity fuze.

Cold War

The Signal Corps' Project Diana, in 1946, successfully bounced radar signals off the moon, paving the way for space communications.

In 1948 researchers at Fort Monmouth grew the first synthetically produced large quartz crystals. The crystals were able to be used in the manufacture of electronic components, and made the United States largely independent of foreign imports for this critical mineral. In 1949 the first auto-assembly of printed circuits was invented. A technique for assembling electronic parts on a printed circuit board, developed by Fort Monmouth engineers, pioneered the development and fabrication of miniature circuits for both military and civilian use. Although they did not invent the transistor, Fort Monmouth scientists were among the first to recognize its importance, particularly in military applications, and did pioneer significant improvements in its composition and production.

Everything was to change as world tensions increased with the Cold War and the Berlin Airlift. To sustain the Army's worldwide commitments, it again became necessary to enlarge the capacity of every activity on-post.

In June 1950, with the onset of the Korean War, President Harry S. Truman quickly received the necessary authorization to call the National Guard and Organized Reserves to 21 months of active duty. He also signed a bill extending the Selective Service Act until 9 July 1951. The Officer Candidate School was reestablished.

The fighting in Korea brought to light the need for new techniques in the conduct of modern warfare. The use of mortars by the enemy, and the resultant need to quickly locate and destroy the mortar sites resulted in development of the Mortar-Radar Locator AN/MPQ-3 and AN/MPQ-10 at the Communications Electronics Research and Development Engineering Center, better known as the Albert J. Myer Center, or simply, the Hexagon. Korea's terrain and road nets, along with the distance and speed with which communications were forced to travel, limited the use of wire. The Signal Corps' VHF radio became the "backbone" of tactical communications throughout the war.

The development of new equipment, however, placed requirements on the Signal Corps to provide increased numbers of trained electronics personnel to work in the fire control and guided missiles firing battery systems. To meet this need, Signal Corps Training Units—the 9614th and 9615th—were established at Aberdeen, Maryland and Redstone Arsenal in Alabama. These units provided instruction on electronics equipment used in the anti-aircraft artillery and guided missile firing systems.

Following the arrest of the Julius and Ethel Rosenberg in 1950, two former Fort Monmouth scientists, Joel Barr and Alfred Sarant, defected to the Soviet Union. On 31 August 1953, having received word of possible subversive activities from Fort Monmouth's commanding general, Kirke B. Lawton, the Chairman of the Permanent Subcommittee on Investigations (PSI), Senator Joseph McCarthy, suspected a spy ring still existed in the Signal Corps labs. At first, McCarthy conducted his hearings behind closed doors, but opened them to the public on 24 November 1953. Extensive Congressional hearings were continued in 1955 under the chairmanship of Senator John McClellan of Arkansas.

In the 1950s the Army Pictorial Service produced a series of television programs called The Big Picture that were often aired on American television. The last episode was produced in 1971.

On 18 December 1958, with Air Force assistance, the Signal Corps launched its first communications satellite, Project SCORE, demonstrating the feasibility of worldwide communications in delayed and real-time mode by means of relatively simple active satellite relays.

The Vietnam War's requirement for high-quality telephone and message circuits led to the Signal Corps' deployment of tropospheric-scatter radio links that could provide many circuits between locations more than 200 miles apart. Other developments included the SYNCOM satellite communications service, and a commercial fixed-station system known as the Integrated Wideband Communications System, the Southeast Asia link in the Defense Communications System.

Korean War and Vietnam War
During the Korean War and Vietnam War the Signal Corps operated officer candidate schools initially at Fort Monmouth in 1950–1953, graduating 1,234 officers, and at Fort Gordon in 1965–1968, which produced 2,213 signal officers. (The World War II Signal OCS program at Fort Monmouth, from 1941–1946 graduated 21,033 Signal Corps officers.)

Modern warfare utilizes three main sorts of signal soldiers. Some are assigned to specific military bases ("Base Ops"), and they are charged with installation, operation and maintenance of the base communications infrastructure along with hired civilian contracted companies. Others are members of non-signal Army units, providing communications capability for those with other jobs to accomplish (e.g. infantry, medical, armor, etc.) in much the same way as, say, the unit supply sections, unit clerks, or chemical specialists. The third major sort of signaleer is one assigned to a signal unit. That is to say, a unit whose only mission is to provide communications links between the Army units in their area of operations and other signal nodes in further areas served by other signal units.

Sending radio signals across the vast Pacific Ocean had always been unreliable. In August 1964, radio communications across the sea were given a huge boost in quality: The first satellite terminal ever installed in a combat zone was installed in Ba Queo, near Saigon, led by Warrant Officer Jack Inman. This enabled trustworthy communications to Hawaii, and thereby to Washington, D.C.

From north to south, communicating across the varied landscapes of Vietnam presented a variety of challenges, from mountains to jungle. The answer came by utilizing the technology of "troposcatter". A radio signal beamed up into the atmosphere is "bounced" back down to Earth with astonishingly good results, bypassing debilitating terrain. The Army had little experience with this technology, so they contracted the development of the systems to Page Engineering. In January 1962, Secretary of Defense Robert McNamara approved the system of troposcatter units under the operational name of BACKPORCH.

The escalation of the number of troops in the Vietnam War caused an increasing need for more communications infrastructure. In the spring of 1966 the assorted Signal units were reassigned to the newly formed 1st Signal Brigade. By the close of 1968 this brigade consisted of six signal groups, and 22 signal battalions—roughly 23,000 soldiers.

The first Vietnam War death on the battlefield was a Signal Corps radio operator, SP4 James Thomas Davis of the 3rd Radio Research Unit of the United States Army Security Agency.

Post Vietnam and Gulf War
A major program in 1988 was the initial production and deployment phase of the mobile-subscriber equipment (MSE) system. The MSE system called for setting up the equivalent of a mobile telephone network on a battlefield, allowing a commander or Tactical Operations Center (TOC) to connect mobile telephones and fax machines in vehicles with each other, sending and receiving secure information. Talking through signal nodes, MSE established a seamless connection from the battlefield even back to commercial telephone lines. Significant to the Signal soldiers, MSE was fielded on the backs of Humvee, rather than on the larger, less-mobile M35 2-1/2 ton cargo trucks—the "deuce and a half".

By 1990, most Army units had replaced their older VRC-12 series FM radios for the new SINCGARS ("SINgle-Channel Ground-Air Radio Systems") family of equipment. Rather than sending a signal along one signal frequency, the SINCGARS radios sent its signals across many frequencies, "hopping" from one frequency to another at high speed. This allowed many nets to share an already-crowded frequency spectrum. Later generations of these radios combined the communications security (COMSEC) encryption devices with the receiver/transmitter, making a single easier-to-program unit. Most significant, the SINCGARS radios could send and receive digital traffic with great fidelity. By the advent of Operation Desert Shield, all Army units were deployed using the most secure FM communications in the world. The SINCGARS radios have a failure rate in extreme heat of once every 7,000 hours compared to the VRC-12 series' failure rate of 2–300 hours.

Global War on Terror
Since 11 September 2001, the Signal Corps has been supporting the Global War on Terror in both Operation Enduring Freedom and Operation Iraqi Freedom. The Signal Corps is currently fielding the Warfighter Information Network – Tactical (WIN-T). It will eventually provide "On-The-Move" down to the company level for maneuver, fires and aviation brigades, and will fully support the Future Combat Systems (FCS) program; and also provide protected satellite communications "On-The-Move" capability against jamming, detection and intercept and will be aligned with the Telecommunications Satellite (TSAT) program.

Military occupational specialties
Signal Corps military occupational specialties are:

Enlisted

 25B: Information Technology Specialist
 25D: Cyber Network Defender
 25E: Electromagnetic Spectrum Manager
 25H: Network Communications Systems Specialist
 25M: Multimedia Illustrator
 25P: Microwave Systems Operator / Maintainer
 25R: Visual Information Equipment Operator / Maintainer
 25S: Satellite Communication Systems Operator / Maintainer
 25T: Satellite / Microwave Systems Chief
 25U: Signal Support Systems Specialist
 25V: Combat Documentation / Production Specialist
 25Z: Visual Information Operations Chief
 26L: Microwave Radio Operator / Repairman
 36C: Telephone Lineman / Field Wireman
 68X: Armament and Electrical Systems Repairer AH-64 A and D models
 94F: Computer/Detection Systems Repairer
 74F: Computer Programmer Analyst

Warrant officer

 255A Information Services Technician
 255N Network Management Technician
 255S Information Protection Technician
 255Z Senior Signal Systems Technician

Note 1: 250N has been changed to 255N.
Note 2: 251A and 254A have been merged into 255A.
Note 3: 255S is new.

Commissioned officer areas of concentration (AOC)
 25A Signal Officer

Commissioned officer functional areas (FA)
 FA26A Telecommunications Systems Engineer
 FA26B Information Systems Engineer

Heraldic items

Coat of arms

 Shield: Argent, within a bordure tenne a baton fesswise or and suspended therefrom a signal flag gules charged at center with a square of the first, in chief a mullet bronze.
 Crest: On a wreath of the colors argent and tenne a dexter hand couped at the wrist, clenched, palm affronte, grasping three forked lightning flashes, all proper, flashes argent.
 Motto: Pro Patria Vigilans (Watchful for the Country).
 The U.S. Army Signal Corps March: "From flag and torch in the Civil War, to signal satellites afar, we give our Army the voice to give command on battlefield or global span, in combat, we're always in the fight we speed the message day or night, technicians too, ever skillful, ever watchful, we're the Army Signal Corps."
 Symbolism:
 Orange and white are the colors traditionally associated with the Signal Corps.
 The signal flag suspended from a baton is adopted from a badge that originated in 1865 and was called the Order of the Signal Corps.
 The bronze battle star represents formal recognition for participation in combat. It adorned a signal flag and was first awarded to Signal Corps soldiers in 1862.

Branch insignia
 The Signal Corps branch insignia is represented by two signal flags crossed, dexter flag white with a red center, the sinister flag red with a white center, staffs gold, with a flaming torch of gold color metal upright at center of crossed flags.
 "Crossed flags" have been used by the Signal Corps since 1868, when they were prescribed for wear on the uniform coat by enlisted men of the Signal Corps.
 In 1884, a burning torch was added to the insignia and the present design adopted on 1 July 1884.
 The flags and torch are symbolic of signaling or communication.

Regimental Distinctive Insignia
 Description: A gold color metal and enamel device that consists of a gold eagle grasping a horizontal baton from which is suspended a red signal flag with a white center, enclosing the flag from a star at the bottom, a wreath of laurel all gold and at top left and right a white scroll inscribed PRO PATRIA at left and VIGILANS at right in gold.
 Symbolism:
 The gold eagle holds in his talons a golden baton, from which descends a signal flag.
 The design originated in 1865 from a meeting of Signal Corps officers, led by Major Albert J. Myer, the chief signal officer, in Washington, D.C.
 The badge was a symbol of faithful service and good fellowship for those who served together in war and was called the Order of the Signal Corps.
 The motto Pro Patria Vigilans (Watchful for the Country) was adopted from the Signal School insignia and serves to portray the cohesiveness of Signal soldiers and their affiliation with their regimental home.
 The laurel wreath depicts the myriad achievements through strength made by the corps since its inception.
 The battle star centered on the wreath represents formal recognition for participation in combat. It adorned a signal flag and was first awarded to Signal Corps soldiers in 1862. The battle star typifies the close operational relationship between the combined arms and the Signal Corps.

Inception
The Signal Corps was authorized as a separate branch of the Army by Act of Congress on 3 March 1863 (Public Law No. 58 Article VIII, Section 17 and 18). However, the Signal Corps dates its existence from 21 June 1860, when Congress authorized the appointment of one signal officer in the Army, and a War Department order carried the following assignment: "Signal Department—Assistant Surgeon Albert J. Myer to be Signal Officer, with the rank of Major, 17 June 1860, to fill an original vacancy."

Branch color
Orange with white piping. Orange was selected in 1872 as the Signal Corps branch color. In 1902, the white piping was added to conform to the custom that prevailed of having piping of a different color for all branches except the line branches.

Notable members
Notable members of the Signal Corps include General of the Army (later General of the Air Force) Henry H. Arnold, Frank Capra, John Cheever, Frank Lautenberg, Stan Lee, Russ Meyer, Tony Randall, Jean Shepherd, John C. Holmes, Julius Rosenberg, Darryl Zanuck, Samuel Alito, and Carl Foreman.

Five members of the Signal Corps have been awarded the Medal of Honor:
 Pfc. Will C. Barnes, for actions during the Indian Wars
 1Lt. Gordon Johnston, for actions during the Philippine–American War
 1Lt. Charles E. Kilbourne, for actions during the Philippine–American War
 Pvt. Morgan D. Lane, for actions during the American Civil War
 BG Adolphus Greely, for life service to the Signal Corps and Army Service from the American Civil War until 1908

See also
 List of U.S. Signal Corps Vehicles
 Ghost Army (Operation Quicksilver)
 Network Enterprise Technology Command/9th Signal Command (Army)
 Joint Electronics Type Designation System
 Russian Signal Troops

Notes

References

 The definitive website on all things historical for the Signal Corps; names of officers that served, enlisted, stories, families and friends, their lives, and more
 List of all Signal Corps Officers that graduated from Army Signal Corps Officer Candidate School during WWII, Korea and Vietnam eras. Includes key enlisted support personnel, graduates of Australian Signal Corps OCS program, et al. Also includes an archive of min-biographies for many of the over 27,000 Officers involved.
 Signal Corps in the Civil War
 Signal Corps History
 Signal Corps Regimental History
 Signal Corps Branch Insignia
 Getting the Message Through: A Branch History of the U.S. Army Signal Corps, R.R. Raines, 1996, Ctr. of Mil. History, US Army, 438 pp.

External links

 150th Anniversary Portal at the United States Army Center of Military History
 Army Lineage Series – Signal Corps
 U.S. Army Signal Center, Fort Gordon
 U.S. Army Signal Officer Candidate School Association
 Signal Corps Regimental Association (SCRA)
 Signal Corps MOS Community
 SCRA, Adolphus Greely Chapter
 SCRA, Greater Atlanta Chapter
 SCRA, Liberty Chapter
 Signal Corps in the Civil War and Military Telegraphs
 Signal Corps Museum
 Global Security Signal Corps
 Voice of Iron: The 143rd Signal Battalion, 3rd Armor Division
 United States Army Signal Corps Officer Candidate School Association
 Feb 1919 Popular Science article about a method to replace semaphore flags with a swinging dot signal: Wigwagging is Now Done by Machine, Popular Science monthly, February 1919, page 82
 Service: Story of the Signal Corps
 
 
 
 

 01
Signal Corps
Signals intelligence
Electronic warfare
Military units and formations established in 1860
1860 establishments in the United States
Articles containing video clips
Military communications corps